Om Prakash Sharma is a Nepali politician of Nepali Congress and Minister for Energy and Drinking water since 9 June 2021. He is also serving as member of the Madhesh Province Provincial Assembly. 

Sharma, a resident of Parsa, was elected to the 2017 provincial assembly elections from proportional list of the party. He including 2 other ministers from Nepali Congress joined Lalbabu Raut ministry on 9 June 2021 after a group of PSP-N was expelled from ministry as a result of talks between the two parties specially PSP-N chairperson Upendra Yadav and NC Vice-president Bimalendra Nidhi.

See also 

 Nepali Congress, Madhesh Province

References 

Living people
Nepali Congress politicians from Madhesh Province
People from Birgunj
Year of birth missing (living people)

Provincial cabinet ministers of Nepal
Members of the 1st Nepalese Constituent Assembly
Members of the Provincial Assembly of Madhesh Province